John Donegan Halligan (1899 – 1977) was a Scottish football player and manager. Halligan played as an inside left for Shawfield, Hibernian and Montrose.

Career
Halligan signed for Hibernian from Shawfield – a Junior side from south Glasgow – on 30 October 1920, around the same time as two other emerging forwards from the same area, Jimmy Dunn and John Walker, and all three became important members of the team which played in two losing Scottish Cup finals in 1923 (to Celtic) and 1924 (to Airdrieonians).

Halligan also remained with the club when they were relegated in 1931 and helped them regain their top division place two years later, winning the 1932–33 Scottish Division Two title. He was a regular in the team until his last game, at home to Falkirk on 14 October 1933, after which he was advised to retire on medical grounds. In all he played 457 times for Hibs in major competitions and scored 74 goals.

Halligan also worked for Hibernian as a coach and scout (from 1933), and in February 1936 was appointed caretaker manager of Hibernian (a job he apparently detested) after the resignation of Bobby Templeton; he held the position for over two months until Willie McCartney became manager. His managerial record in the league was played 11, won 6, drawn 1 and lost 4. He made a brief playing comeback for Montrose in the 1937-38 season.

He died in Glasgow in 1977, aged 77.

References

1899 births
Date of birth missing
1977 deaths
Scottish footballers
Footballers from Glasgow
Association football inside forwards
Shawfield F.C. players
Hibernian F.C. players
Montrose F.C. players
Scottish Football League players
Hibernian F.C. non-playing staff
Scottish football managers
Hibernian F.C. managers
Scottish Football League managers
Scottish Junior Football Association players